The 2010–11 UMBC Retrievers men's basketball team represented University of Maryland, Baltimore County in the 2010–11 NCAA Division I men's basketball season. The team played in the America East Conference (AEC) and was led by head coach Randy Monroe, in his seventh year. The Retrievers finished with a record of 5–25, 4–12 in the America East.

Schedule
 
|-
!colspan=9 style=| Regular season

|-
!colspan=9 style=| America East tournament

References

UMBC
UMBC Retrievers men's basketball seasons
UMBC Retrievers men's basketball
UMBC Retrievers men's basketball